Namaste Falls is located in Bhedetar village development committee of Dhankuta district. It is popular among domestic tourists. The falls are about 80 meters high. Domestic tourists from Jhapa, Dhankuta, Morang and Sunsari visit this falls in large. One can see a rainbow-like, seven-colour formation while standing close to the waterfall. It is in the shape of Namasthe. The falls are also frequently visited by researchers.

Geography
It is located 8 km away from Vedatar.

Tourism
Tourism is common in the area. Along with the falls, Vedatar and Agricultural Research Station on Pakhribas are located nearby. However, there are no human settlements nearby.

Gallery

See also
List of waterfalls of Nepal

References

Waterfalls of Nepal